The Lewis G. Kline Building, located in Corvallis, Oregon, is listed on the National Register of Historic Places.

See also
 National Register of Historic Places listings in Benton County, Oregon

References

National Register of Historic Places in Benton County, Oregon
Buildings and structures in Corvallis, Oregon
Buildings and structures completed in 1889
Italianate architecture in Oregon
1889 establishments in Oregon